Henry Goes Arizona is a 1939 American Western film starring Frank Morgan.

Plot
Henry "Hank" Conroy is as an actor, who inherits his dead brother's ranch. While adjusting to the country there, he is threatened by a gang who is after the ranch. The film was directed by Edwin L. Marin.

Cast

References

External links 
 
 
 
 

1939 films
American black-and-white films
Films directed by Edwin L. Marin
1939 Western (genre) films
Metro-Goldwyn-Mayer films
American Western (genre) films
Films produced by Harry Rapf
Films about actors
Films about inheritances
Films with screenplays by Florence Ryerson
1930s English-language films
1930s American films